Son Duk-sung (Hangul: 손덕성, Hanja: 孫德成) (June 17, 1922 – March 29, 2011) was a martial artist, Grand Master, 9th degree black belt, co-founder of the Korean martial art of Tae Kwon Do, successor of Lee Won-kuk and leader of  the Chung Do Kwan school (1950–1959).  He was also the chief Instructor of the South Korean Army and the Eighth U.S. Army, founder and president of the World Tae Kwon Do Association and author of the books "Korean Karate, the Art of Tae Kwon Do” and “Black Belt Korean Karate ".

The Beginning 

Son Duk-sung, was born in Seoul, in what is now known as South Korea, on June 17, 1922.  At that time South Korea was under the Japanese regime.

He started practicing boxing at the age of 16, and after gruesome training, he rose quickly towards becoming a national champion in his category. Back then, it was very common for him to return home each night, with his face all bruised up and cuts all over it that kept him from eating; therefore his parents decided to forbid him from practicing boxing.  It is then, in 1942, that he decided to start his Tang Soo Do Chung Do Kwan style training (School of the Blue Wave), under the supervision of Lee Won-kuk, who was just returning from Japan, as Son would later remember.

“It was a different world. In the boxing Gym, people would steal your shoes, or your towel, and the place was always dirty. But in the Chung Do Kwan School, everyone was kind; there was an atmosphere of camaraderie and friendship; we all worked out together. The style was of no contact, so no one was beaten or hurt.”

After arduous years of training, he obtained his first degree black belt; becoming part of the first generation class of the Chung Do Kwan School, among Uhm Woon-kyu, Chung Yong-taek, Kang Suh-chong, Myun Hyun-jong, and others.

At the end of World War II in 1945, Korea was involved in several military, political and social conflicts that forced Lee Won-kuk to emigrate to Japan in 1951. These conflicts made Lee officially retire from teaching, leaving Son as his successor. During the Korean War, Son took over the leadership role at the Chung Do Kwan School, gathered some school members and kept teaching and promoting the Chung Do Kwan style through tournaments, exhibitions and press articles.

Son sent the advanced school students to teach classes at the most prestigious institutions of South Korea: Uhm was assigned to teach classes at the Korean Military Academy, the Sung Kyun Kwan University and the Seoul National University. Nam Tae-hi was sent to train the South Korean Army, and Duk himself taught classes to the Seoul police and the Eighth U.S. Army.

Korean President, Syngman Rhee, named Duk chief instructor of the Republic of South Korea's Army; and it is then when he met General Choi Hong-hi, Major-General of the 29th Infantry Division, with whom he made strong friendship bonds. In 1955, due to his closeness with President Syngman Rhee, and thinking that he could use the military authority of Choi Hong-hi to spread the Chung Do Kwan style, Duk gave an honorary 4th degree Dan in front of the major of the 3rd Army for his contribution to the martial arts.

Tae Kwon Do Is Born 
On December 19, 1955, while searching for a name that would identify the Korean culture, a meeting was held by the Chung Do Kwan School advisors with views to unify the name of the Korean martial art, which was known by different and confusing names such as Tang Soo Do, Gong Soo Do, Taekyon and Kwon Bup; these terminologies were occasionally associated with the Chinese or Japanese culture.

During this meeting, representatives of the South Korean Government, members of the press, politicians and the military met with Son Duk-sung, chief of the Chung Do Kwan School, who came to the meeting accompanied by General Choi Hong-hi and Nam Tae-hi, who represented the military branch of the School.

As result of this meeting and the ideas proposed as a group by the representatives of the Chung Do Kwan School, the name “Tae Kwon Do” was created officially to define the Korean martial art and unify all of the other existing names.

Internal Conflicts 
With the efforts of Son Duk-sung, the Chung Do Kwan School started to grow until it became the largest in South Korea, at both civil and military levels; but the original members of the school looked for a more protagonist participation that would take them to open independently new schools under their own names within the Korean martial arts atmosphere.

Choi Hong-hi, high-ranking officer of the South Korean army, was ordered to start a military school in 1954. He recruited a group 50 military, some of whom were high ranking students from the Chung Do Kwan School (Hyun Jong-myun, Nam Tae-hi, Han Cha-kyo, Woo Jong-rim, Ko Jae-chun, Kim Suk-kyu, and Kwak Kuen-suk - all professional soldiers). This school became known as the Oh Do Kwan School and sent instructors to Vietnam to train the South Korean troops without permission from Duk.Kang Suh-chong created Kuk Mu Kwan School, and other instructors started to hardly recognize Son as a school official. The influence and leadership of General Choi, started to grow.

On June 16, 1959, Son, worried about keeping the philosophical principles of the Chung Do Kwan School, published a letter in the South Korean newspaper “Seoul Shimoon”, dismissing a group of advanced students which included Choi, Nam, Uhm among others. This caused a total separation and the exclusion of Duk from all sport organizations in Korea.

Acting rapidly upon such action, Choi Hong-hi, gathered all other members of the top schools and took over the leadership role of Chung Do Kwan:

“At the end of the fall of 1959, I invited all leaders of the 4 top Kwans to my home.  No, Byung Jik represented Song Moo Kwan; Yoon, Kwe-byung represented Ji Do Kwan; Lee, Nam-suk represented Chang Moo Kwan; and Hwang, Ki represented Moo Duk Kwan; while I represented Oh Do Kwan and Chung Do Kwan.” 

As result from this meeting, on September 3, 1959, the Korean Tae Kwon Do Association was born. Its first president was Choi Hong-hi, who named Uhm Woon-kyu  -in that same year-  as new school chief (Kwan Jang) of the Chung Do Kwan School.  General Choi was elected president due to his position as general in the Korean Army (under military regime) and for the promise he made to other school chiefs to promote TaeKwon-Do.

Trip to the United States of America 
In April 1963, Son traveled to the United States of America, where he started to teach Tae Kwon Do or “Korean Karate” as it was called then.  His first classes were outdoors at Central Park in Manhattan and at the basement of downtown synagogue in New York City.  At the end of 1963 he established regular classes Monday through Friday from 6 to 8pm in his first gym, located at 162 7th corner of 21st street in New York City.

Soon enough he started teaching classes at  West Point  Military Academy, the Universities of Princeton, New York, Brown and Fordham, the New York State University on Stony Brook, and the YMCA of New Jersey among others. He also established the Tae Han Karate Association, which in 1966, became the World TaeKwon-Do Association.

The organization grew fast and in 1965 a group of Korean instructors, some of them ex-students of Son in Korea, established themselves in the country and their first black belts started to promote the martial art in the United States.  In 1969, Luke Grande arrives to Venezuela and founded the first Tae Kwon Do Chung Do Kwan School in that country. In 1987, Rod Preble started teaching the martial art in Australia.

The first 11 black belts promoted by Son Duk-sung in North America were:

 Martin Rosenberg
 Thomas(Tom) Carrillo
 Robert J. Clark
 Joe La Marca
 Ron Kelly
 James Yergan
 Neil Gingold
 Luke Grande
 Jeff Potter
 Donald Zammit
Joe Lamar

As his first students would remember:

“At the first years of his arrival to the USA, the trainings were very intense.  We ran in Central Park and then kick a tree at least 100 times with each leg; under snow or rain, with the intense heat of the summer, the trainings never stopped. Then we would train at the gym at 6pm.  We would do this routine six times a week.”

World Tae Kwon Do Association 
The current World Tae Kwon Do Association entity is an independent organization not governed by the Kukkiwon, and it doesn't follow the guidelines of the World Taekwondo Federation or the International Taekwon-Do Federation. It developed itself under the original philosophical and human principles, following its traditional roots.  Its current president is Yehjong Son.

In 1966 Son Duk-sung endorsed a proposal made by Jae Bock Chung to establish the World Tae Kwon Do Association (WTA), substituting the Tae Han Karate Association created by Son in 1962.  Son became president, and at the peak of its existence, the World Tae Kwon Do Association amassed more than 495 schools in the United States, Venezuela and Australia, and it became the largest Tae Kwon Do organization in the United States.

Other masters who assumed important WTA roles were:

Chung Yong-taek – Vice-president 
J.B. Chung – Director
K.H. Kim – Technical Director
Young-Sik Choi – Midwest Director
D.H. Kim – West Coast Director
S.P. Chang – East Coast Director
H.S. Ko – Southern Director 
N.Y. Chung – Tournament Organizer
K.W. Yu – Examiner
C.K. Han – Advisor
Dr. Robert Sexton - Attending Physician
T.D. Kim, T.Y. Kim, Y.K. Chang, and N.Y. Cho – Other members of the Board of Directors

In 1999, due to differences between the board of directors and the leadership of the WTA regarding who will be the next president, the board of directors decided to leave the association, so they organized a new association, the National Tae Kwon Do Association (NTA). Since the early 1990s, the WTA organization fragmented and the majority of its former members are spread out in more than 26 independent Tae Kwon Do organizations in the United States and Venezuela.

American Masters in the World Tae Kwon Do Association:

Son awarded to six of his American instructors with the degree of "master" in the martial art. The six American masters are:

Rico Dos Anjos 
Jerry Orenstein 
Ralph Rubino 
Jack Emmel
Ron Geoffrion  
Jim Cahill

Later graduates 
Michael T. Dealy, Ph.D. (Founder of the World Martial Arts Association, Brooklyn, NY)
 Jake Pontillo (Founder of Buffalo University Tae Kwon Do Club, 1970)
Luke Grande.1970 founder of Tae Kwon Do in  Venezuela.
 Ricardo Dos Anjos (Westchester, NY- World Tae Kwon Do Association)
 Jerry Orenstein (Tae Kwon Do Chung Do Kwan Schools)
 Ron Geoffrion (co-founder of the USA Tae Kwon Do Masters Association)
 Ralph Rubino (co-founder of the USA Tae Kwon Do Masters Association)
 Jack Emmel (co-founder of the USA Tae Kwon Do Masters Association)
 Jim Cahill (co-founder of the USA Tae Kwon Do Masters Association)
 Pete Michaelson (Tae Kwon Do Chung Do Kwan Schools)
 Ray Mondschein (Founder of Rochester,NY -North American Tae Kwon Do Chung Do Kwan
 Humberto Almeida 1976 WTA US Certificate 921 (Co-founder Director of Organización Venezolana Chung Do Kwan)
 Charles LaVanchy (co-founder of Traditional Tae Kwon Do Chung Do Kwan Association w/ GM Choi, Yong-sik
 Víctor Alfonso (Founder of Chung Do Kwan Alfonso's)
 Bob Heckmann (Founder of Five Points Karate, World Tae Kwon Do Association)
 Keith A. Lipsey (American Taekwondo Society-Tiger Fist Division, World Tae Kwon Do Association)
 Álvaro Rodríguez 1980 US 1535, Caracas Venezuela
 Adolfo Vivas 1980 WTA US Certificate 1534, Caracas Venezuela, Co-founder Director of ORVECDK, Venezuelan Chung Do Kwan Organization

Death 
Son Duk-sung, died on 29 March 2011 at Newport Hospital, Newport, RI, United States Of America.  He is survived by his daughter Yehjong Son and her husband, Steven G. Cundy and his granddaughter Lahna Son-Cundy.

References

External links
World Martial Arts Association

1922 births
2011 deaths
South Korean male taekwondo practitioners
People from Seoul
Martial arts school founders
20th-century philanthropists